Rawsonville is a locality in Dubbo Regional Council, New South Wales, Australia.

References

Towns in the Central West (New South Wales)
Dubbo Regional Council